Guangdong Evergrande V.C. is a Chinese professional women's volleyball club, currently based in Shenzhen, Guangdong, founded in 2009 and sponsored by Evergrande Group. They are the winners of the bronze medal at the 2013 FIVB Women's Club World Championship and won one champion title of Chinese Volleyball League.

History 
Guangdong Evergrande Women's Volleyball Club (廣東恆大女子排球俱樂部 (traditional) / 广东恒大女子排球俱乐部 (simplified))is a professional women's volleyball club based in Guangzhou, Guangdong and play in the 361° Chinese Women's Volleyball League. The club was founded on April 24, 2009 and became the first professional volleyball club in China.

With 12 straight win, they won the Chinese Women's Volleyball League Group B in 2009–2010 season and qualified to the Group A.

In the 2010–2011 season they play in the Chinese Women's Volleyball League Group A, in the semifinal, they got huge came back from 26 points down to defeat Shanghai, but they lost 2–3 to defending champion Tianjin Bridgestone in the finals.

During the 2011–2012 season, they defeated the defending champion in the semifinal, making Tianjin Bridgestone the first time can't reach to the finals in the past decade. They won their first title on March 3, 2012, and became the 5th Champion team in Chinese Women's Volleyball League history.

Guangdong Evergrande played at the 2013 Club World Championship and claimed the bronze medal-winning 3–1 to Voléro Zürich. The team had Shen Jingsi named Best Setter.

In 2014, due to head coach Lang Ping is resigned and the main sponsor Evergrande Group decided to put more of their investment to football league, Guangdong Evergrande VC was demoted to Group B league of China because of the unsatisfactory result, for about two seasons.

In Season 2017/18, as the Group A league is expanded, Guangdong Evergrande VC is announced to came back to the Chinese Group A League.

CVL results

Team Roster of Season 2020–2021

 see also the Team Roster from past seasons

Former players

Achievements

Chinese Volleyball League Group A :
   Champion  (1): 2011–2012
 Runner-up (1): 2010–2011, 2012–2013
Chinese Volleyball League Group B :
 1st place  : 2009–2010 (Qualify for the Group A)
FIVB Volleyball Women's Club World Championship:
 3rd place: 2013 FIVB Volleyball Women's Club World Championship

Competitions

Chinese Volleyball League Group B

Chinese Volleyball League Group A

Club Records
Since 2009.11.28 the first time Participate the Chinese volleyball league. Correct as of 28 January 2012.

Team

Record Longest streaks : 14 matches, during the 2011–2012 season (2011.12.20–2012.2.14)
Record Most wins in one season :  20 matches,  during the 2011–2012 season
Record Most points win in one set :  25 – 5  V.S Henan Zhengzhou Hi-tech dist. 2011.3.1
Record Fewest set points defeat in one set : 9 – 25 V.S Tianjin Bridgestone 2011.3.22

Player

Record Most Starting line player:Yin Meng, 57 matches since 2009–2010 season
Record Most Scorer :Zhou Yuan total got 510 Points
Record Most Scorer in one season: Jovana Brakočević total got 427 Points during the 2010–2011 season
Record Most Spike Scorer in one season: Katarzyna Skowrońska total got 358 Points during the 2011–2012 season
Record Most Block Scorer in one season: Suo Ma total got 58 Points during the 2010–2011 season
Record Most Serve Scorer in one season: Logan Tom total got 35 Points during the 2010–2011 season

Season Best

Best Scorer History

 only show the top 10 players, see also the other ranked player

References

External links 
 Hengda Women suspense no longer qualify for an A (China Real Estate News)

Chinese volleyball clubs
Sports teams in Guangdong